Sviatoslav Ihorovych Lunyov (born April 19, 1964 in Kyiv), is a Ukrainian composer. He is author of symphonic, chamber, choral, piano and electroacoustic music. Among his works are operas ("Moscow - Cockerels", "Poorly Tempered Songs") and music for movies. In 2017, he received the Bronze Cannes Lion, for Witness. He is member of the National Union of Composers of Ukraine.

He graduated from the Kyiv Conservatory where he studied with Lev Kolodub. Since 2000, he has been a lecturer at the Kyiv Conservatory.

The 2020 Ukrainian Contemporary Music Festival, featured his work  Dances of New Russians.

References

External links 

 https://www.lunyov.com/

Ukrainian composers
1964 births
Kyiv Conservatory alumni
Living people